Hassine Bouhageb (Arabic: حسين بوحاجب) born 20 October 1872 and dead 13 March 1946. He was a Tunisian doctor, educator and a sponsor for the Tunisian sport.

Biography 
Hassine's father, Salem Bouhageb was a big reformer, in Europe and especially in Paris, Libourne and Florence. He sent his son to France to study in Lakanal de Sceaux high school.

After graduation, Hassine Bouhageb enrolled in the medical school of Bordeaux where he got his medical doctorate 23 December 1901.

Upon his return to Tunisia, he started the Tunisia renewal and modernization movement with Ali Bach Hamba, Bechir Sfar and Abdeljelil Zaouche.

He represented a good sample of new generation who after finishing their studies abroad, wanted to improve their nation's conditions by continuing the reformist movement that the general Hayreddin Pacha, Mohamed Bayram V and his father started earlier.

On 31 December 1904, Hassine Bouhageb became head of Service in the Sadiki hospital. Later, he got transferred to the Ernest-Conseil hospital. In 1911, he got elected as the headmaster of the Tunisian Muslim Association and the municipal society of Nasria. He led the Ech-Chahama Al Arabya theater troupe between 1915 and 1930.

He had a remarkable contribution during the fight to counter the epidemics that persisted even 30 years after the establishment of the French protectorate of Tunisia.
Hassine Bouhageb has a lot of publications about child nutrition and on how to improve nutrition in Tunisia. He is also the initiator of the development of sport activities in Tunisia.

Personal life 
Hassine Bouhageb is Salem Bouhageb's son.

He is also Khelil Bouhageb's brother who became grand vizir.

References 

People from Tunis
Article from WikiLeaders project
20th-century Tunisian physicians